The 1892 Missouri gubernatorial election was held on November 8, 1892 and resulted in a victory for the Democratic nominee, former Congressman William J. Stone, over the Republican candidate former Congressman William Warner, Populist candidate Leverett Leonard, and Prohibition candidate John Sobieski.

Results

References

Missouri
1892
Gubernatorial
November 1892 events